Kuzminovka is a rural locality (a village) in Kadyrgulovsky Selsoviet, Davlekanovsky District, Bashkortostan, Russia. The population was 41 as of 2010. There is 1 street.

Geography 
Kuzminovka is located 35 km east of Davlekanovo (the district's administrative centre) by road. Khusainovo is the nearest rural locality.

References 

Rural localities in Davlekanovsky District